The Diocese of Nancy and Toul (Latin: Dioecesis Nanceiensis et Tullensis; French: Diocèse de Nancy et de Toul) is a Latin Church ecclesiastical territory or diocese of the Catholic Church in France. After a considerable political struggle between Louis XV, Louis XVI, and the Dukes of Lorraine,  the diocese was erected by Pope Pius VI on 17 December 1777. The Diocese of Nancy is a suffragan diocese in the ecclesiastical province of the metropolitan Archdiocese of Besançon.

History
The title of count and the rights of sovereignty of the medieval Bishops of Toul originated in certain grants which Henry the Fowler gave St. Gauzelin in 927. During the Conflict of Investitures in 1108, the chapter became divided: the majority elected Riquin of Commercy as bishop; the minority chose Conrad of Schwarzenburg. Henry V granted Conrad the title of bishop, with the stipulation that he did not exercise episcopal office.

In 1271 grave differences broke out again in the chapter of Toul. In 1278 Pope Nicholas III personally appointed Conrad of Tübingen as bishop. Thereafter, it was generally the Holy See which appointed the bishops, alleging various reasons as vacancies arose. As a result, many Italian prelates held this important see until 1552, when Toul was occupied by France. In 1597 Charles III, duke of Lorraine asked Pope Clement VIII for the dismemberment of the See of Toul and the creation of a see at Nancy; this failed through the opposition of Arnaud d'Ossat, Henry's ambassador at Rome. In the end, Clement VIII decided that Nancy was to have a primatial church and that its prelate would have the title of Primate of Lorraine and wear episcopal insignia, but should not exercise episcopal jurisdiction.

In 1648 according to the Treaty of Westphalia the bishoprics of Metz, Toul and Verdun (all belonging to the Holy Roman Empire) became French cities. The duchy of Lothringen, surrounded by French territories and repeatedly occupied by French troops, finally fell to the French, and Lorraine became a French province. The population of Toul was around 10,000 persons in 1688. After the French revolution of 1789 France was divided into departments—Lorraine consisted of the departments of Meurthe, Meuse, Moselle and Vosges. Nancy, Verdun, Metz and Epinal became the capitals of these departments.

In 1688, the Cathedral of Toul had a Chapter with ten dignities and forty Canons. In the city of Toul there were seven parishes, seven houses of male religious and four monasteries of monks.  The diocese had around 200 parishes.

In 1777, the Cathedral of Nancy had a Chapter in which there were three dignities and twenty-four Canons. In the city of 30,000 persons there were 7 parishes, twelve houses of male religious, and ten monasteries of monks.  All cathedral chapters in France were abolished in 1790 by the Constituent Assembly.

In 1777 and 1778 Toul lost territories out of which were formed two new dioceses: Saint-Die and Nancy, both of them suffragans of Trier. The Concordat of 1802, suppressing Toul, made Nancy the seat of a vast diocese which included three Departments: Meurthe, Meuse, and Vosges.

Revolution
The diocese of Nancy was abolished during the French Revolution by the Legislative Assembly, under the Civil Constitution of the Clergy (1790). Its territory was subsumed into the new diocese, called 'Meurthe', which was part of the Metropolitanate called the 'Metropole du Nord-Est' (which included seven new 'départements' and dioceses). The Civil Constitution mandated that bishops be elected by the citizens of each 'département', which immediately raised the most severe canonical questions, since the electors did not need to be Catholics and the approval of the Pope was not only not required, but actually forbidden. Erection of new dioceses and transfer of bishops, moreover, was not in the competence of civil authorities or of the Church in France. The result was schism between the 'Constitutional Church' and the Catholic Church.  The legitimate bishop of Nancy,  Anne Louis Henri de La Fare, refused to take the oath, and therefore the episcopal seat was declared vacant.

On 13 March 1791 the electors of Meurthe were assembled, and elected the Lazarist P.-F. Chatelain, a Professor at the Seminary in Toul. After some considerable consideration, he refused the election. The electors therefore returned to their deliberations, and, on the recommendation of the Ecclesiastical Committee of the National Assembly, on 8 May 1791 chose the Oratorian Luc-François Lalande of Saint-Lô, a theologian and student of Hebrew. He was consecrated a bishop at Notre Dame in Paris on 29 May by  Jean-Baptiste Gobel, the titular Bishop of Lydda, who had been installed as Constitutional Bishop of Paris. On 3 June he made his official entry into Nancy, where he began a war of pamphlets with Bishop de la Fare, who was in exile in Trier.  In September 1792 Lalande was elected a delegate to the Convention, where, on 7 November, he renounced his functions. In 1795 he became a member of the Council of 500.  In 1801 he wrote a letter of submission to Pope Pius VII.  At the end of 1799, an assembly of Constitutional priests elected Francois Nicolas of Epinal as a successor to Lalande.

Afterward
Nicolas, and all the Constitutional Bishops, were required to resign in May 1801 by First Consul Bonaparte, who was negotiating a treaty with Pope Pius VII, the Concordat of 1801 (15 July 1801). Nicolas never recanted. Once the Concordat went into effect, Pius VII was able to issue the appropriate bulls to restore many of the dioceses and to regulate their boundaries, most of which corresponded closely to the new 'départements'. The Concordat of 1802, suppressing Toul, made Nancy the seat of a vast diocese which included three Departments: Meurthe, Meuse, and Vosges.

In a Bull of 6 October 1822, Pope Pius VII re-established the Dioceses of Verdun and Saint-Dié, detaching from the diocese of Nancy the departments of Meuse and Vosges. Since 1824 the bishops of Nancy have borne the title of Bishops of Nancy and Toul, since nearly all of the territory of the ancient Diocese of Toul is united with that of Nancy.

Bishops
 1777–1783 : Louis-Apolinaire de La Tour du Goupille-Montauban
 1783–1787 : François de Fontanges
 1787–1816 : Anne Louis Henri de La Fare
 1802–1823 : Antoine Eustache d'Osmond
 1823–1844 : Charles-Auguste-Marie-Joseph de Forbin-Janson
 1844–1859 : Alexis-Basile-Alexandre Menjaud
 1859–1863 : Georges Darboy
 1863–1867 : Charles-Martial d'Allemand-Lavigerie
 1867–1882 : Joseph-Alfred Foulon
 1882–1918 : Charles-François Turinaz
 1918–1919 : Charles-Joseph-Eugène Ruch
 1919–1930 : Hippolyte-Marie de La Celle
 1930–1934 : Etienne-Joseph Hurault
 1934–1949 : Fleury de Marcel
 1949–1956 : Marc-Armand Lallier, also archbishop of Marseille
 1957–1971 : Emile-Charles-Raymond Pirolley
 1972–1991 : Jean Albert Marie Auguste Bernard
 1991–1998 : Jean-Paul Maurice Jaeger
 1999–present : Jean-Louis Henri Maurice Papin

See also
Catholic Church in France

References

Reference works

  (Use with caution; obsolete)

Studies

External links
  Centre national des Archives de l'Église de France, L’Épiscopat francais depuis 1919, retrieved: 2016-12-24.

Roman Catholic dioceses in France
Nancy, France
1777 establishments in France
Organizations based in Grand Est